Richard Philip Malone (born 22 August 1947) is a Scottish former professional footballer. A defender, he appeared for Sunderland in the 1973 FA Cup Final winning team.

After playing for junior side Shotts Bon Accord, Malone started his senior career with Ayr United, for whom he had played 163 league matches and scored twenty goals. He was the only full back at that time to score a hat trick.

Malone joined Sunderland in October 1970 and was a Scotland under-23 international (match against France).

In the FA Cup Final victory, Second Division Sunderland beat Leeds United 1-0. Malone played 235 (+1) league matches for Sunderland, scoring two goals.

Malone left Sunderland to join Hartlepool United in July 1977.  After playing 36 league matches and scoring two goals for the club, he was transferred to Blackpool in November 1978, playing 49 matches for them scoring one goal. The goal came in a 5–2 victory over Swindon Town at Bloomfield Road on 15 May 1979. His contract with Blackpool was cancelled in May 1980 by Alan Ball.

In season 1980–81, Malone returned to Scotland to play for Queen of the South. With the Dumfries club, Malone won promotion from the Scottish Second Division. Alongside Malone at Queen of the South was a player with a name that would have sounded familiar to Malone, Queens' long serving goalkeeper Allan Ball. QoS left winger Jimmy Robertson later said when asked who the best players were that he played beside at Queens, 'Dick Malone, you could tell he had played at a higher level than most of us'.

After leaving Queens he returned to non league football by joining Gateshead.

Honours

Sunderland - 1973 FA Cup Final winner
 Queen of the South - 1981 Scottish Second Division promotion

References

1947 births
Living people
Footballers from Motherwell
Scottish footballers
Shotts Bon Accord F.C. players
Ayr United F.C. players
Hartlepool United F.C. players
Sunderland A.F.C. players
Blackpool F.C. players
Queen of the South F.C. players
Gateshead F.C. players
Scotland under-23 international footballers
Scottish Football League players
English Football League players
Association football defenders
FA Cup Final players